AGW may refer to:

 Anthropogenic global warming, overall warming of Earth's climate caused or produced by humans
 Actual gold weight, a measure used in gold bullion, coin or bar
 Agnew Airport (IATA: AGW), Queensland, Australia
 Access gateway, shorthand for multi-service access gateway (MSAG), a device used in telecommunications
 Argentine Great Western Railway
 Art Gallery of Windsor, Ontario, Canada
 Attorney General of Washington
 Attorney General of Wisconsin
 Attorney General of Wyoming
 Auditor General for Wales
 Avia Airlines (ICAO: AGW), a former airline Johannesburg, South Africa
 Kahua language (ISO 639-3: agw)